Ipomoea is the largest genus in the plant family Convolvulaceae, with over 600 species. It is a large and diverse group, with common names including morning glory, water convolvulus or water spinach, sweet potato, bindweed, moonflower, etc. The genus occurs throughout the tropical and subtropical regions of the world, and comprises annual and perennial herbaceous plants, lianas, shrubs, and small trees; most of the species are twining climbing plants.

Their most widespread common name is morning glory, but some species in related genera bear that same common name and some Ipomoea species are known by different common names. It refers to their twining habit.

Uses and ecology 

Human uses of Ipomoea include: 
Most species have spectacular, colorful flowers, and are often grown as ornamentals, and a number of cultivars have been developed. Their deep flowers attract large Lepidoptera - especially the Sphingidae, such as the pink-spotted hawk moth (Agrius cingulata) - or even hummingbirds.
The genus includes food crops; the tubers of sweet potatoes (I. batatas) and the leaves of water spinach (I. aquatica) are commercially important food items, and have been for millennia. The sweet potato is one of the Polynesian "canoe plants", transplanted by settlers on islands throughout the Pacific. Water spinach is used all over eastern Asia and the warmer regions of the Americas as a key component of well-known dishes, such as canh chua rau muống (Mekong sour soup) or callaloo; its numerous local names attest to its popularity. Other species are used on a smaller scale, e.g. the whitestar potato (I. lacunosa) traditionally eaten by some Native Americans, such as the Chiricahua Apaches, or the Australian bush potato (I. costata). The peduncles or seed pods of Ipomoea muricata are consumed as a delicacy in the Indian state of Kerala.
Peonidin, an anthocyanidin potentially useful as a food additive, is present in significant quantities in the flowers of the 'Heavenly Blue' cultivar.
Ipomoea sepiaria, is part of the Dashapushpam (Ten sacred flowers) in Kerala and is known as "Thiruthali" in Malayalam.
Moon vine (I. alba) sap was used for vulcanization of the latex of Castilla elastica (Panama rubber tree, Nahuatl: olicuáhuitl) to rubber; as it happens, the rubber tree seems well-suited for the vine to twine upon, and the two species are often found together. As early as 1600 BCE, the Olmecs produced the balls used in the Mesoamerican ballgame.
The root called John the Conqueror in hoodoo and used in lucky and/or sexual charms (though apparently not as a component of love potions, because it is a strong laxative if ingested) usually seems to be from I. jalapa. The testicle-like dried tubers are carried as amulets and rubbed by the users to gain good luck in gambling or flirting. As Willie Dixon wrote, somewhat tongue-in-cheek, in his song "Rub My Root" (a Muddy Waters version is titled "My John the Conquer Root"):
My pistol may snap, my mojo is frail
But I rub my root, my luck will never fail
When I rub my root, my John the Conquer root
Aww, you know there ain't nothin' she can do, Lord,
I rub my John the Conquer root

As medicine and entheogen 

Humans use Ipomoea spp. for their content of medical and psychoactive compounds, mainly alkaloids. Some species are renowned for their properties in folk medicine and herbalism; for example, Vera Cruz jalap (I. jalapa) and Tampico jalap (I. simulans) are used to produce jalap, a cathartic preparation accelerating the passage of stool. Kiribadu ala (giant potato, I. mauritiana) is one of the many ingredients of chyawanprash, the ancient Ayurvedic tonic called "the elixir of life" for its wide-ranging properties.

The leaves of I. batatas are eaten as a vegetable, and have been shown to slow oxygenation of LDLs, with some similar potential health benefits to green tea and grape polyphenols.

Other species were and still are used as potent entheogens. Seeds of Mexican morning glory (tlitliltzin, I. tricolor) were thus used by Aztecs and Zapotecs in shamanistic and priestly divination rituals, and at least by the former also as a poison, to give the victim a "horror trip" (see also Aztec entheogenic complex). Beach moonflower (I. violacea) was also used thusly, and the cultivars called 'Heavenly Blue', touted today for their psychoactive properties, seem to represent an indeterminable assembly of hybrids of these two species.Ergoline derivatives (lysergamides) are probably responsible for the entheogenic activity. Ergine (LSA), isoergine, D-lysergic acid N-(α-hydroxyethyl)amide and lysergol have been isolated from I. tricolor, I. violacea and/or purple morning glory (I. purpurea); although these are often assumed to be the cause of the plants' effects, this is not supported by scientific studies, which show although they are psychoactive, they are not notably hallucinogenic. Alexander Shulgin in TiHKAL suggests ergonovine is responsible, instead. It has verified psychoactive properties, though as yet other undiscovered lysergamides possibly are present in the seeds.

Though most often noted as "recreational" drugs, the lysergamides are also of medical importance. Ergonovine enhances the action of oxytocin, used to still post partum bleeding. Ergine induces drowsiness and a relaxed state, so might be useful in treating anxiety disorder. Whether Ipomoea species are  useful sources of these compounds remains to be determined. In any case, in some jurisdictions, certain Ipomoea are regulated, e.g. by the Louisiana State Act 159, which bans cultivation of I. violacea except for ornamental purposes.

Pests and diseases 
Many herbivores avoid morning glories such as Ipomoea, as the high alkaloid content makes these plants unpalatable, if not toxic. Nonetheless, Ipomoea species are used as food plants by the caterpillars of certain Lepidoptera (butterflies and moths). For a selection of diseases of the sweet potato (I. batatas), many of which also infect other members of this genus, see List of sweet potato diseases.

Pollination 
The species of Ipomoea interfere with each other's pollination. Pollen from different species compete in each other's reproductive processes, imposing a fitness cost.

Gallery

See also
 List of Ipomoea species

References

External links 

 
 Fine Gardening: Morning glories and more

 
Convolvulaceae genera
Medicinal plants
Taxa named by Carl Linnaeus
Taxa described in 1753